Plumeri Park is the College of William & Mary Tribe baseball team's home stadium located in Williamsburg, Virginia. It has been in use since 1999. Joseph J. Plumeri II, a William & Mary alumnus (Class of 1966) and former Tribe baseball player who is Chairman & CEO of Willis Group Holdings, funded most of the construction costs, thus the park is named after him. Plumeri Park is a baseball-only facility and it includes a state of the art scoreboard, a 10-foot artificial turf halo behind the home plate area, locker rooms, a press box, concession space, a grandstand, and covered and outdoor batting cages. It seats up to 1,000 people and has stadium lights, enabling the Tribe to host night games. The park's inaugural game was on March 20, 1999, with the William and Mary Tribe hosting the Penn State Nittany Lions and winning 16–10.

See also
 List of NCAA Division I baseball venues

References

External links
Tribe Athletics

1999 establishments in Virginia
Baseball venues in Virginia
College baseball venues in the United States
Sports venues completed in 1999
Sports venues in Hampton Roads
William & Mary Tribe baseball
William & Mary Tribe sports venues
College of William & Mary buildings